The following elections occurred in the year 2012.

International
 2012 United Nations Security Council election

Africa

Egypt
 2012 Egyptian presidential election

Mali
 2012 Malian presidential election
 2012 Malian parliamentary election

Senegal
 2012 Senegalese presidential election
 2012 Senegalese parliamentary election

Sierra Leone
 2012 Sierra Leonean general election

Somaliland
 2012 Somaliland parliamentary election

Asia
 Abkhazia: Abkhazian parliamentary election
 People's Republic of China: 12th National People's Congress
 Hong Kong
 2012 Hong Kong Chief Executive election
 2012 Hong Kong legislative election
 India
 2012 Indian presidential election
 Legislative Assembly elections in India, 2012
 Indonesian gubernatorial elections, 2012  
 Acehnese gubernatorial election
 Jakarta gubernatorial election
 Iran: Iranian legislative election
 Japan 
 Japanese general election
 Kyoto mayoral election
 Tokyo gubernatorial election
 Kuweit 
 general election, February
 general election, December
 Malaysia: Democratic Action Party leadership election
 Mongolia: legislative election
 Myanmar (Burma): by-elections
 Philippines: Negros Occidental's 5th legislative district special election
 Russia presidential election
 South Korea
 presidential election
 legislative election
 Republic of China (Taiwan) 
 presidential election
 legislative election

Europe
 Czech Republic: 
 Czech Senate election 
 Czech regional elections
 Finland
 presidential election
 municipal election
 France: * presidential election
 Germany
 presidential election
 Saarland state election
 Schleswig-Holstein state election
 North Rhine-Westphalia state election
 Lithuania: parliamentary election
 Romania
 local election
 legislative election
 Russia: presidential election
 Serbia
 presidential election
 parliamentary election
 Vojvodina parliamentary election
 Spain
 Andalusian parliamentary election
 Elections to the General Council of the Principality of Asturias
 Ukraine: parliamentary election
 United Kingdom
 2012 United Kingdom local elections
 2012 Scottish local elections

Middle East

Iran
 2012 Iranian legislative election

North America

Mexico
 2012 Mexican presidential election

United States
 2012 United States elections

Presidential
 2012 United States presidential election

Senate
 2012 United States Senate elections
 United States Senate election in Connecticut, 2012
 United States Senate election in Florida, 2012
 United States Senate election in Indiana, 2012
 United States Senate election in Maryland, 2012
 United States Senate election in Massachusetts, 2012
 United States Senate election in Missouri, 2012
 United States Senate election in Nebraska, 2012
 United States Senate election in Nevada, 2012
 United States Senate election in New Mexico, 2012
 United States Senate election in North Dakota, 2012
 United States Senate election in Ohio, 2012
 United States Senate election in Pennsylvania, 2012
 United States Senate election in Rhode Island, 2012
 United States Senate election in Texas, 2012
 United States Senate election in Utah, 2012
 United States Senate election in Vermont, 2012
 United States Senate election in Virginia, 2012
 United States Senate election in Washington, 2012
 United States Senate election in West Virginia, 2012
 United States Senate election in Wisconsin, 2012

House of Representatives
 2012 United States House of Representatives elections
 United States House of Representatives elections in Alabama, 2012
 United States House of Representatives election in Alaska, 2012
 United States House of Representatives elections in Arizona, 2012
 United States House of Representatives elections in Arkansas, 2012
 United States House of Representatives elections in California, 2012
 United States House of Representatives elections in Colorado, 2012
 United States House of Representatives elections in Connecticut, 2012
 United States House of Representatives elections in Delaware, 2012
 United States House of Representatives elections in Florida, 2012
 United States House of Representatives elections in Georgia, 2012
 United States House of Representatives elections in Hawaii, 2012
 United States House of Representatives elections in Idaho, 2012
 United States House of Representatives elections in Illinois, 2012
 United States House of Representatives elections in Indiana, 2012
 United States House of Representatives elections in Iowa, 2012
 United States House of Representatives elections in Kansas, 2012
 United States House of Representatives elections in Kentucky, 2012
 United States House of Representatives elections in Louisiana, 2012
 United States House of Representatives elections in Maine, 2012
 United States House of Representatives elections in Maryland, 2012
 United States House of Representatives elections in Massachusetts, 2012
 United States House of Representatives elections in Michigan, 2012
 United States House of Representatives elections in Minnesota, 2012
 United States House of Representatives elections in Mississippi, 2012
 United States House of Representatives elections in Missouri, 2012
 United States House of Representatives election in Montana, 2012
 United States House of Representatives elections in Nebraska, 2012
 United States House of Representatives elections in Nevada, 2012
 United States House of Representatives elections in New Hampshire, 2012
 United States House of Representatives elections in New Jersey, 2012
 United States House of Representatives elections in New Mexico, 2012
 United States House of Representatives elections in New York, 2012
 United States House of Representatives elections in North Carolina, 2012
 United States House of Representatives elections in North Dakota, 2012
 United States House of Representatives elections in Ohio, 2012
 United States House of Representatives elections in Oklahoma, 2012
 United States House of Representatives elections in Oregon, 2012
 United States House of Representatives elections in Pennsylvania, 2012
 United States House of Representatives elections in Rhode Island, 2012
 United States House of Representatives elections in South Carolina, 2012
 United States House of Representatives elections in South Dakota, 2012
 United States House of Representatives elections in Tennessee, 2012
 United States House of Representatives elections in Texas, 2012
 United States House of Representatives elections in Utah, 2012
 United States House of Representatives elections in Vermont, 2012
 United States House of Representatives elections in Virginia, 2012
 United States House of Representatives elections in Washington, 2012
 United States House of Representatives elections in West Virginia, 2012
 United States House of Representatives elections in Wisconsin, 2012
 United States House of Representatives elections in Wyoming, 2012

Gubernatorial
 2012 United States gubernatorial elections
 2012 Delaware gubernatorial election
 2012 Indiana gubernatorial election
 2012 Missouri gubernatorial election
 2012 Montana gubernatorial election
 2012 New Hampshire gubernatorial election
 2012 North Carolina gubernatorial election
 2012 North Dakota gubernatorial election
 2012 Utah gubernatorial election
 2012 Washington gubernatorial election
 2012 Puerto Rico gubernatorial election

Central America

Dominican Republic
 2012 Dominican Republic presidential election

Oceania

Australia
 2012 Australian Capital Territory general election
 2012 Northern Territory general election
 2012 Queensland state election
 further elections

South America

Brazil
 2012 Brazilian municipal elections

Venezuela
 presidential election
 regional elections

See also
 List of presidential elections in 2012

here
here
 
2012
Elections